A credit assistant is a person employed by an organization to provide support services to credit managers, credit analysts and other members of the credit department. This position is often entry level. Job responsibilities may include:
 Collections
 Gathering credit reports, financial histories and other data for credit analysts
 Verifying credit reference information
 Customer service

Education and background 
Credit assistants often hold associate degrees and/or have experience as collectors or accounts receivables clerks.

Employment 
The average salary for credit assistants in the United States is $36,216.

Professional organizations 
Credit assistants in the United States can obtain memberships, continuing education and certification through NACM. Certification levels include Credit Business Associate, Certified Credit and Risk Analyst, Credit Business Fellow, Certified Credit Executive, Certified International Credit Professional and International Certified Credit Executive.

See also 
 Credit analyst
 Credit manager
 Director of credit and collections

References 

Credit management
Finance occupations